The 1928 Ohio Bobcats football team was an American football team that represented Ohio University in the Buckeye Athletic Association (BAA) during the 1928 college football season. In their fifth season under head coach Don Peden, the Bobcats compiled a 6–3 record and outscored opponents by a total of 256 to 72.

Schedule

References

Ohio
Ohio Bobcats football seasons
Ohio Bobcats football